The Netherlands was represented by duo De Spelbrekers, with the song '"Katinka", at the 1962 Eurovision Song Contest, which took place on 18 March in Luxembourg City. "Katinka" was the winner of the Dutch national final for the contest, held on 27 February.

Before Eurovision

Nationaal Songfestival 1962
The national final was held at the Theater Concordia in Bussum, hosted by Hannie Lips and Elisabeth Mooy. Seven songs took part and the winning song was chosen by 12 regional juries, each with 60 points to divide between the songs. "Katinka" emerged the clear winner by a 28-point margin. Future Dutch representative Conny Vandenbos (1965) was one of the other participants.

At Eurovision 
On the night of the final De Spelbrekers performed 8th in the running order, following Germany and preceding eventual contest winners France. Voting was by each national jury awarding 3, 2 and 1 points to their top three songs, and at the end of the evening "Katinka" (along with the entries from Austria, Belgium and Spain) had failed to pick up a single point, the second time the Netherlands had finished at the foot of the scoreboard. 1962 was the first contest in which any entry failed to score, but the "honour" of being Eurovision's first ever nul-pointer is generally awarded to Belgium's Fud Leclerc, as he had performed earliest of the four in the running order. The Dutch jury awarded its 3 points to Monaco.

The Dutch conductor at the contest was Dolf van der Linden.

Despite its poor showing at Eurovision, "Katinka" was a big domestic hit and remains one of the better-remembered Dutch Eurovision entries from the contest's early years.

Voting 
The Netherlands did not receive any points at the 1962 Eurovision Song Contest.

References

External links 
 Dutch Preselection 1962

1962
Countries in the Eurovision Song Contest 1962
Eurovision